The black margate (Anisotremus surinamensis), also known as black bream, black thicklip, dogfish, lippe, Mexican bull, pompon, Spanish grunt, surf bream, sweetlips or thicklip grunt, is a species of marine ray-finned fish, a grunt belonging to the family Haemulidae. It is native to the western Atlantic Ocean.

Description
The black margate has a deep, compressed body with a high back and a short, blunt head. The mouth is positioned low on the head, it is horizontal with fleshy lips and the jaws are equipped with bands of teeth on both jaws. The outer band of teeth are conical in shape. It has a greyish-silver body which is darker on the anterior half than the posterior half. The dorsal scales have black centres and the fins are dark grey, the pelvic and anal fins being the darkest. There is a darker pt h to the rear of the pectoral fins. The juveniles have a black stripe along the lateral line and another along the upper back, and a large black spot on base of tail fin. the dorsal fin has 12 spines and 18 soft rays while the anal fin contains 3 spines and 9 soft rays. There is a deep notch in the dorsal fin and the fourth dorsal spine is longer than the others while the second anal spine is also very large.

Distribution
The black margate is found in the warmer parts of the Western Atlantic Ocean. It is found in Florida from Cape Canaveral south through the Florida Keys to the Gulf of Mexico, including the Flower Garden Banks, from Rockport, Texas along the coast of Mexico to the northern Yucatan Peninsula and northwestern Cuba. It occurs throughout the Caribbean Sea then and along the northern and eastern coasts of South America to Rio de Janeiro in Brazil. It also occurs at the Fernando de Noronha and Trinidade Island.

Habitat and biology
It frequently takes shelter in caves, ledges and within wrecks. It is normally encountered either as small groups or individuals. It is a nocturnal feeder, it’s diet including crustaceans, molluscs, smaller fish and urchins. A frequent item in its diet are sea urchins in the genus Diadema. They may gather in spawning aggregations and, off Jamaica, breeding adults have been reported between April and August. Larvae and young juveniles have been observed settling on rocky seabed’s off Florida.

Systematics
The black margate was first formally described in 1791 as Lutjanus surinamensis by the German naturalist Marcus Elieser Bloch (1723–1799) with the type locality given as Suriname.

Utilisation
The black margate is occasionally caught and marketed by fisheries, although the consumption of the flesh of larger fishes has been linked to cases of ciguatera poisoning. They are also found in the aquarium trade.

References

External links
Marinespecies.org
 

Black margate
Fish of the Atlantic Ocean
Fish described in 1791